Heathers is a 1989 American black comedy thriller film written by Daniel Waters and directed by Michael Lehmann, in both of their respective film debuts. The film stars Winona Ryder, Christian Slater, Shannen Doherty, Lisanne Falk, Kim Walker, and Penelope Milford. Its plot portrays four teenage girls—three of whom are named Heather—in a clique at an Ohio high school, one of whose lives is disrupted by the arrival of a misanthrope intent on murdering the popular students and staging their deaths as suicides.

Waters wrote Heathers as a spec script and originally wanted Stanley Kubrick to direct the film, out of admiration for Kubrick's own black comedy film Dr. Strangelove. Waters intended for the film to contrast the more optimistic teen movies of the era, particularly those written by John Hughes, by presenting a cynical depiction of high school imbued with dark satire.

After being filmed in Los Angeles from February to March of 1988, Heathers premiered at the Sundance Film Festival on January 21 1989, before New World Pictures theatrically released the film in the United States on March 31, 1989. It went on to win the Independent Spirit Award for Best First Feature, and for his screenplay, Waters received the Edgar Award for Best Motion Picture Screenplay. It has since become popular and is regarded in polls as one of the greatest coming-of-age films of all time. Heathers has since been adapted into a musical and a television series.

Plot
At Westerburg High School in Sherwood, Ohio, Veronica Sawyer is part of a popular but feared clique, along with three other wealthy and beautiful girls with the same first name: Heather Duke, Heather McNamara, and the school's ruthless queen bee, Heather Chandler. The four girls often play croquet in Veronica's backyard. Tired of the clique abusing its power, Veronica longs for her old life with her kinder but less popular friends. She becomes fascinated with Jason "J.D." Dean, a new student and rebellious outsider, after he pulls out a gun and fires blanks to scare football-player bullies Kurt Kelly and Ram Sweeney.

Veronica attends a frat party with Chandler, where she refuses to have sex with one of the members (unlike Chandler, who was coerced to perform oral sex on one) and drunkenly vomits on Chandler. In retaliation, Chandler vows to destroy her reputation. Later that night, J.D. shows up by surprise at Veronica's house, and the two have sex outside. They express to each other their mutual hatred of Chandler's tyranny.

The next morning, Veronica and J.D. break into Chandler's house, planning to get revenge by using a fake hangover cure to make Chandler vomit. J.D. pours drain cleaner into a mug, but Veronica dismisses him, thinking he is making a mean joke. She mixes orange juice and milk together instead. However, Veronica accidentally brings the wrong mug to Chandler's room; J.D. notices this but says nothing. He serves Chandler the drain cleaner, killing her. Veronica panics, and J.D. urges her to forge a dramatic suicide note in Chandler's handwriting. The school and community regard Chandler's apparent suicide as a tragic decision made by a troubled teenager, making her even more worshipped in death than in life. Meanwhile, Duke uses the attention surrounding Chandler's death to gain popularity, becoming the clique's new leader.

After Chandler's funeral, McNamara convinces Veronica to go with her, Kurt, and Ram on a double date. J.D. finds the four teens that evening in a field, and Veronica leaves with him as Kurt passes out, while Ram rapes McNamara. The following day, the boys spread a false rumor about Veronica performing oral sex on them, ruining her reputation. J.D. proposes that he and Veronica lure the boys into the woods, shoot them with tranquilizers, and humiliate them by staging the scene to look like they were lovers participating in a suicide pact. 

In the forest, J.D. shoots Ram, but Veronica's shot misses Kurt, who runs away. J.D. chases Kurt back towards Veronica who, realizing that the bullets are in fact lethal, fatally shoots him in a panic. J.D. and Veronica are nearly caught by police, but they make out in a station wagon to pretend they were there all along and had nothing to do with it. At their funeral, the boys are made into martyrs to homophobia. Growing increasingly disturbed by J.D.'s behavior (behavior which may be influenced by his mother's suicide and his sociopathic wealthy father's abuse of people), Veronica breaks up with him.

A little while after this, J.D. blackmails Duke into getting every student to sign a "petition" that, unbeknownst to her, is intended to act as a mass suicide note. He then gives her a red scrunchie that Chandler had worn, signifying her new power over the school. Meanwhile, Martha Dunnstock, a large girl who is a frequent target of bullying, pins a suicide note to her chest and walks into oncoming traffic. She survives but is badly injured and mocked by her peers for attempting to copy the popular kids. Later, McNamara calls a radio show to discuss her depression; Duke tells the entire school about the radio call the next day, and McNamara is bullied. McNamara attempts suicide by overdosing in the girls' bathroom, but Veronica intervenes.

Veronica returns home, and her parents say that J.D. stopped by to tell them that he was worried she would attempt suicide. He leaves a note revealing he can successfully imitate her handwriting, and a Barbie doll hanging in her room. J.D. breaks into Veronica's house with a plan to kill Heather Duke, but the murder is revealed to be a dream sequence. Realizing that J.D. plans to kill her, she fakes her own suicide-by-hanging. J.D. finds her and, assuming she is dead, gives a monologue revealing his plan to blow up the school pep rally and make it look like a mass suicide. 

The next day, Veronica confronts J.D. in the boiler room as he plants dynamite. She shoots him, and his switchblade cuts the wires to the detonator. Veronica goes outside, and J.D. follows her with a bomb strapped to his chest. He offers a personal eulogy and detonates the bomb, killing himself. As students and faculty rush outside to see what happened, Veronica walks back inside, dirty and disheveled from the explosion. She approaches Duke, takes the red scrunchie, and asserts that Duke is no longer in charge. Veronica then invites Martha to spend prom night watching movies together, as Duke looks on.

Cast

Production

Development
Daniel Waters began writing the screenplay in spring of 1986, while he was working at a video store. Waters wanted the film to be directed by Stanley Kubrick, not only out of admiration for him, but also from a perception that "Kubrick was the only person that could get away with a three-hour film". (The cafeteria scene near the start of Heathers was written as a homage to the barracks scene which opens Kubrick's Full Metal Jacket.) After a number of failed attempts to get the script to Kubrick, Waters approached director Michael Lehmann, who he met through a mutual friend. Lehmann agreed to helm the film with producer Denise Di Novi.

In the original version of the script, J.D. successfully blows up Westerburg High, and the final scene features a surreal prom gathering of all the students in heaven. Executives at New World Pictures agreed to finance the film, but they disliked the dark ending and insisted that it be changed.

Some reviewers have discussed similarities between Heathers and Massacre at Central High, a low-budget 1976 film. Daniel Waters has stated that he had not seen Massacre at Central High at the time he wrote Heathers but that he had read a review of it in a Danny Peary book about cult movies and that the earlier film may have been "rattling around somewhere in my subconscious".

Casting
Many actors and actresses turned down the project because of its dark subject matter. Early choices for Veronica were Justine Bateman and Jennifer Connelly. Winona Ryder, who was 16 at the time of filming and badly wanted the part, begged Waters to cast her as Veronica, even offering to work for free. Waters at first did not think Ryder was pretty enough, and Ryder herself commented that "at the time, I didn't look that different from my character in Beetlejuice. I was very pale. I had blue-black dyed hair. I went to Macy's at the Beverly Center and had them do a makeover on me." Ryder's agent was so opposed to her pursuing the role that she got down on her hands and knees to beg Ryder not to take it, warning her that it would ruin her career. Eventually, she was given the role. Brad Pitt read for the role of J.D. but he was rejected. Christian Slater reports throwing a "big tantrum" and tossing his script in the trash after assuming he'd bombed his audition. He was signed to play J.D. shortly after Ryder was cast, stating later that he channeled Jack Nicholson in the film.

Heather Graham, then 17, was offered the part of Heather Chandler, but turned it down due to her parents' disapproval of the film. Kim Walker, who was dating Slater at the time, was offered the role instead. Lisanne Falk, 23 years old at the time, lied and said she was in her late teens during the audition. It was only after she was cast that she revealed her true age. Seventeen-year-old Shannen Doherty wanted the role of Veronica, but Ryder had been cast, so the producers asked her to audition for Heather Chandler. Doherty was more interested in playing Heather Duke, and ended up giving an "amazing" reading as Duke, which secured her the part. The producers wanted her to dye her hair blonde to match the other "Heathers", but Doherty refused, so they compromised on her having red hair.

Filming
Principal photography took place over 33 days in February and March 1988, on a budget of $3 million. Although set in Ohio, filming was done entirely in Los Angeles. "Westerburg High School" is an amalgam of Corvallis High School (now Bridges Academy) in Studio City, Verdugo Hills High School in Tujunga, and John Adams Middle School in Santa Monica. The gymnasium scenes were shot at Verdugo Hills High, and the climactic scene on the stairs was filmed outside John Adams Middle School. The funeral scenes were filmed at Church of the Angels in Pasadena, California, a location used in other media including Buffy the Vampire Slayer and Just Married.

Michael Lehmann has called Doherty "a bit of a handful" on set, in part because she objected to the swearing in the script and refused to say some of the more explicit lines. Falk stated that Doherty "didn't have much of a sense of humor, and she took herself a little seriously", and Di Novi said: "I don't think Shannen really got what Heathers was. And that worked for us. She made that character real." When the cast first viewed the movie, Doherty ran out crying because she realized the film was a dark comedy and not the drama she was expecting.

Soundtrack

The film uses two versions of the song "Que Sera, Sera", the first by singer Syd Straw and another over the end credits by Sly and the Family Stone. On the film's DVD commentary, Di Novi mentions that the filmmakers wanted to use the original Doris Day version of the song, but Day would not lend her name to any project using profanity.

The song "Teenage Suicide (Don't Do It)" by the fictional band Big Fun was written and produced for the film by musician Don Dixon, and performed by the ad hoc group "Big Fun", which consisted of Dixon, Mitch Easter, Angie Carlson, and Marti Jones. The song is included on Dixon's 1992 greatest hits album (If) I'm a Ham, Well You're a Sausage.

The film's electronic score was composed and performed by David Newman, and a soundtrack CD was subsequently released.

Release

Box office
Heathers was screened at the Sundance Film Festival on January 21, 1989, and was released to the U.S. public in March 1989, at which time New World Pictures was going bankrupt. The film was considered a flop when it was released, earning $177,247 in its opening weekend and ultimately grossing $1.1 million in the United States over five weeks.

Home media
New World Video released Heathers on VHS and LaserDisc in 1989, and it developed a cult following after being unsuccessful at the box office. It was released again on LaserDisc on September 16, 1996, as a widescreen edition digitally transferred from Trans Atlantic Entertainment's interpositive print under the supervision of cinematographer Francis Kenny. The sound was mastered from the magnetic sound elements. The film was then first released on DVD on March 30, 1999, in a barebones edition. In 2001, a multi-region special edition THX DVD was released from Anchor Bay Entertainment in Dolby Digital 5.1. The DVD was released in the United States, Canada, Australia, and Europe, and achieved high sales. Each release included a different front cover featuring Veronica, J.D., Chandler, Duke, and McNamara.

In 2001, a limited edition DVD set of only 15,000 copies was released. The set contained an audio commentary with director Michael Lehmann, producer Denise Di Novi and writer Daniel Waters, as well as a 30-minute documentary titled Swatch Dogs and Diet Cokeheads, featuring interviews with Ryder, Slater, Doherty, Falk, Lehmann, Waters, Di Novi, director of photography Francis Kenny, and editor Norman Hollyn. It also includes a theatrical trailer, screenplay excerpt, original ending, biographies, 10-page full-color fold-out with photos and liner notes, an 8-inch "Heathers Rules!" ruler, and a 48-page full-color yearbook style booklet with rare photos. The film was then re-released on Blu-ray by Image Entertainment in 2011 as a barebones edition, two years after Anchor Bay.

In June 2018, Arrow Films reported that Heathers would be re-released on August 8, 2018, in cinemas and on September 10 on Blu-ray, in a new 4K restoration. On July 1, 2008, a new 20th anniversary special edition DVD set was released by Anchor Bay to coincide with the DVD of writer Waters' new film Sex and Death 101. The DVD features a new documentary, Return to Westerburg High. On November 18, 2008, Anchor Bay released a Blu-ray with all the special features from the 20th anniversary DVD and a soundtrack in Dolby TrueHD 5.1. On November 12, 2019, Image Entertainment released a 30th Anniversary steelbook edition on Blu-ray. This release did not utilize Arrow Films' 4K restoration and featured new and previous special features.

Critical reception

Initial reviews 
Writing in April 1989 for The Washington Post, journalist Desson Thomson wrote that it "may be the nastiest, cruelest fun you can have without actually having to study law or gird leather products. If movies were food, Heathers would be a cynic's chocolate binge." Chicago Sun-Times film critic Roger Ebert gave the film 2.5 stars out of 4 and wrote that Heathers "is a morbid comedy about peer pressure in high school, about teenage suicide and about the deadliness of cliques that not only exclude but also maim and kill." While conceding its ability to provoke thought and shock, Ebert questioned how the mixed sensibility as a dark murder comedy and "cynical morality play" led to difficulty in understanding its point of view, while remarking that, "Adulthood could be defined as the process of learning to be shocked by things that do not shock teenagers, but that is not a notion that has occurred to Lehmann."

Retrospective responses 
On Rotten Tomatoes the film has an approval rating of 93% based on contemporary and retrospective reviews from 56 critics and an average rating of 7.8/10. The site's critical consensus reads: "Dark, cynical, and subversive, Heathers gently applies a chainsaw to the conventions of the high school movie – changing the game for teen comedies to follow." On Metacritic, the film has a weighted average score of 72/100 based on 20 reviews by mainstream critics. Academics have likened Heathers to other films popular during the 1980s and early 1990s which characterized domestic youth narratives as part and parcel of the "culture war".

Waters created a specific set of slang and style of speech for the film, wanting to ensure that the language in the film would have "timeless" quality instead of just reflecting teen slang at the time. The film is among the most cited in the Oxford English Dictionary.

Related projects

Possible film sequel
On June 2, 2009, Entertainment Weekly reported that Ryder had claimed that there would be a sequel to the film, titled Heathers 2, with Slater coming back "as a kind of Obi-Wan character". However, Lehmann denied development of a sequel, saying, "Winona's been talking about this for years—she brings it up every once in a while and Dan Waters and I will joke about it, but as far as I know there's no script and no plans to do the sequel."

Musical

In 2010, Heathers was adapted into a stage musical directed by Andy Fickman. Fickman also worked on the musical Reefer Madness, a parody of the anti-cannabis movie of the same name which was turned into a feature film. Heathers: The Musical, which opens with a number depicting Veronica's acceptance into the Heathers' clique, received several readings in workshops in Los Angeles and a three-show concert presentation at Joe's Pub in New York City on September 13–14, 2010. The cast of the Joe's Pub concert included Annaleigh Ashford as Veronica, Jenna Leigh Green as Heather Chandler, and Jeremy Jordan as J.D.

The musical played at Off-Broadway's New World Stages with performances beginning March 15, 2014, and an opening night on March 31. The original cast of the Off-Broadway production included Barrett Wilbert Weed as Veronica Sawyer, Jessica Keenan Wynn as Heather Chandler, Ryan McCartan as JD, Alice Lee as Heather Duke, and Elle McLemore as Heather McNamara. It closed on August 4, 2014.

An Off West End production of Heathers, directed by Andy Fickman, played at The Other Palace in London with performances between June 19 and August 4, 2018. Its cast included Carrie Hope Fletcher as Veronica Sawyer, Jodie Steele as Heather Chandler, Jamie Muscato as JD, T’Shan Williams as Heather Duke and Sophie Isaacs as Heather McNamara. It transferred to the West End in September 2018, playing in Theatre Royal Haymarket, London. A high school production of the musical is the focus of the "Chapter Fifty-One: Big Fun" episode of Riverdale.
In 2021 Heathers returned for a limited run at the Haymarket with Christina Bennington playing Veronica Sawyer and Jordan Luke Gage as JD. The three Heathers were played by Jodie Steele (Heather Chandler), Bobbi Little (Heather Duke) and Frances Mayli McCann (Heather McNamara). It then went on to play at The Other Palace where it remains.

Television adaptation

In March 2016, TV Land ordered a pilot script for an anthology dark comedy series, set in the present day, with a very different Veronica Sawyer dealing with a very different but equally vicious group of Heathers. The series was written by Jason Micallef and Tom Rosenberg, and Gary Lucchesi was the executive producer In January 2017, the Heathers TV show was ordered to Series at TV Land. Shannen Doherty, the movie's Heather Duke, makes a cameo appearance in the pilot.

In March 2017, it was reported that the series was moved to the then upcoming Paramount Network. Selma Blair has a recurring role in the series. A trailer for the rebooted series was released in August 2017. The series stars Grace Victoria Cox as Veronica Sawyer, James Scully as J.D., Melanie Field as Heather Chandler, Brendan Scannell as Heather Duke, Jasmine Mathews as Heather McNamara, Birgundi Baker as Lizzy, and Cameron Gellman as Kurt. The series was set to premiere on March 7, 2018, but on February 28, 2018, it was announced that the premiere would be delayed in light of the Stoneman Douglas High School shooting.

References

External links

 
 
 Heathers at Turner Classic Movies
 
 
 

1980s feminist films
1980s black comedy films
1980s high school films
1980s satirical films
1980s teen comedy films
American black comedy films
American coming-of-age comedy films
American high school films
American films about revenge
American independent films
American satirical films
American teen comedy films
Edgar Award-winning works
Films about bullying
Films about eating disorders
Films about murderers
Films about school violence
Films about suicide
Films directed by Michael Lehmann
Films produced by Denise Di Novi
Films scored by David Newman
Films set in Ohio
Films shot in Los Angeles
New World Pictures films
American serial killer films
Films with screenplays by Daniel Waters (screenwriter)
1980s English-language films
1980s American films
1989 films
1989 comedy films
1989 directorial debut films
1989 independent films